Sivrice, is a town of Elazığ Province of Turkey. It is the seat of Sivrice District. Sivrice is on the shore of Lake Hazar. Its population is 3,645 (2021).

History

On 24 January 2020 the town was impacted by a magnitude 6.7 earthquake.

References

Towns in Turkey
Populated places in Elazığ Province
Ski areas and resorts in Turkey
Sivrice District
Kurdish settlements in Elazığ Province